Our Lady of Mercy Academy may refer to:
Our Lady of Mercy Academy (New Jersey), Newfield, New Jersey
Our Lady of Mercy Academy (New York), Syosset, New York
Academy of Our Lady of Mercy, Lauralton Hall, Milford, Connecticut

See also
Our Lady of Mercy High School (disambiguation)